Willingdon is a hamlet in central Alberta, Canada within the County of Two Hills No. 21.

History 
Willingdon originally incorporated as a village on August 31, 1928. It dissolved from village status 89 years later on September 1, 2017, becoming a hamlet under the jurisdiction of the County of Two Hills No. 21.

In 1985, one of the last two traditional wooden grain elevators in Alberta was built in Willingdon by the Alberta Wheat Pool.

Demographics 

As a designated place in the 2016 Census of Population conducted by Statistics Canada, Willingdon had a population of 319 living in 130 of its 160 total private dwellings, a  change from its 2011 population of 275.

See also 
List of communities in Alberta
List of hamlets in Alberta

References 

1928 establishments in Alberta
2017 disestablishments in Alberta
Designated places in Alberta
Former villages in Alberta
Hamlets in Alberta